The women's 800 metres event  at the 1981 European Athletics Indoor Championships was held on 21 and 22 February.

Medalists

Results

Heats
First 2 from each heat (Q) and the next 2 fastest (q) qualified for the semifinals.

Final

References

800 metres at the European Athletics Indoor Championships
800
Euro